In the Land of Hi-Fi with Georgie Auld and His Orchestra is an album by American jazz saxophonist and bandleader Georgie Auld featuring tracks recorded in 1955 and released on the EmArcy label.

Reception
Allmusic awarded the album 4 stars stating "The music mixes together swing, bop, and cool jazz in winning fashion".

Track listing
 "In the Land of Hi-Fi" (Auld - May) - 4:15   
 "For You" (Dubin - Burke) - 2:23   
 "Until the Real Thing Comes Along" (Sammy Cahn, Saul Chaplin, L.E. Freeman) - 2:19   
 "Tippin' In" (Leveen - Grever) - 3:06   
 "Sunday Kind of Love" (Barbara Belle, Anita Leonard, Stan Rhodes, Louis Prima) - 2:22   
 "I May Be Wrong" (Henry Sullivan, Harry Ruskin) - 3:53   
 "Swingin' in the Moore Park" (May) - 3:02   
 "If I Loved You" (Richard Rodgers, Oscar Hammerstein II) - 2:46   
 "Dinah" (Harry Akst, Sam M. Lewis, Joe Young) - 2:34   
 "They Can't Take That Away from Me" (George Gershwin, Ira Gershwin) - 2:45   
 "My Blue Heaven" (Walter Donaldson, George A. Whiting) - 2:54   
 "Love Is Just Around the Corner" (Lewis E. Gensler, Leo Robin) - 3:53  
Recorded at Capitol Studios in Los Angeles on September 29 (tracks 8, 10 & 11), November 7 (tracks 1-3 & 9) and November 11 (tracks 5-8), 1955

Personnel 
Georgie Auld - tenor saxophone, bandleader 
Maynard Ferguson, Conrad Gozzo, Mannie Klein, Ray Linn - trumpet
Tommy Pederson, Frank Rosolino, Si Zentner - trombone
Skeets Herfurt, Willie Schwartz - alto saxophone
Ted Nash, Babe Russin - tenor saxophone
Chuck Gentry - baritone saxophone 
Arnold Ross - piano
Al Hendrickson, Barney Kessel - guitar
Joe Mondragon, Joe Comfort - bass  
Alvin Stoller, Irv Kottler - drums

References 

1955 albums
Georgie Auld albums
EmArcy Records albums